The 1923 American Cup was the annual open cup held by the American Football Association.

American Cup bracket
Home teams listed on top of bracket

(*): replay after tied match

Final

See also

1923 National Challenge Cup
1923 National Amateur Cup

References

Amer
American Cup